Doppio Borgato is a Pedal piano made by joining a regular concert grand (Model L 282) with a second piano, activated by a pedal board with 37 pedals (A0 to A3), similar to that of the organ (P 398). Designed and manufactured by Luigi Borgato, it was patented in 2000.

Compositions for Doppio Borgato 

Specifically for Doppio Borgato are composed:
Cristian Carrara
"Magnificat, Meditation" for piano with pedalboard and orchestra (2011)
Giuseppe Lupis
Gounod-Lupis "Marche funèbre d'une marionnette" (2011)
Nimrod Borenstein
"Fireworks" Op. 57 (2011)
Grieg-Borenstein "In the hall of the mountain-king" arranged for piano with pedalboard (2011)
Michael Glenn Williams
"Tip Tap" (2011)
Ennio Morricone (1928–2020)
"Quarto Studio Bis" (2011)
Andrea Morricone (born 1964)
"Omaggio a J.S.B." (2011)
Franco Oppo (1935–2016)
"Freu dich sehr o meine Seele" (2000)
Fabrizio Marchionni (born 1976)
"S’Indàssa" (2000)
Charlemagne Palestine (1945 or 1947-)
Compositions for pedal piano (2005)
Jean Guillou (1930–2019)
"Epitases" (2001)
 Anything written for Pipe Organ can also be played on the Doppio Borgato Pedal piano.

Further reading

 Jean Guillou, La Lettre de l'Argos, Paris, December 2001.
 Brian T. Majeski, The Music Trades, November 2000, p. 86.
 Pianist Magazine, April May 2006 UK.
 Honka Verdurmen, Piano Wereld, Netherlands, August–September 2005.
 Larry E. Ashley, Pierce Piano Atlas, 12th edition, Larry E. Ashley Publisher, Albuquerque NM U.S.A., 2008, p. 58.
 Géreard Gefen, Piano, Editions du Chêne – Hachette Livre, 2002 p. 59, 166, 170, 180.
 Atanasio Cecchini, Piano Dream. History of the Piano, Mosè Edition, 2007 p. 170-171.
 Dario Miozzi, in Musica Rivista di cultura musicale e discografica, Zecchini Editions, December 2010 – January 2011 p. 54, 59–60.
 Luca Segalla, in Musica, Rivista di cultura musicale e discografica, Zecchini Editore, n°224 March 2011 p. 68
Stuart Isacoff, on the book  A Natural History of the Piano, The Instrument, the Music, the Musicians—from Mozart to Modern Jazz and Everything in Between, edited by Alfred A. Knopf, New York 2011, p. 48

Piano
Composite chordophones
Italian inventions
Keyboard instruments